Alexander Sharychenkov (born October 3, 1991) is a Russian professional ice hockey goaltender who currently plays for HC CSKA Moscow of the Kontinental Hockey League (KHL).

Playing career
Sharychenkov made his debut with Dynamo Moscow during the 2012–13 season.

After a successful 2019–20 season, with Neftkhimik Nizhnekamsk, Sharychenkov left out of contract and agreed to a two-year contract with contending club, CSKA Moscow on 1 May 2020.

Having played the 2020–21 season with CSKA notching 18 wins through 36 regular season games, on 1 June 2021, Sharychenkov was traded by CSKA Moscow to Salavat Yulaev Ufa in exchange for financial compensation.

After a lone season with Salavat, Sharychenkov opted to return as a free agent to newly crowned champions and previous club, CSKA Moscow, in agreeing to a two-year contract on 5 May 2022.

Awards and honours

References

External links

1991 births
Living people
Ak Bars Kazan players
HC CSKA Moscow players
HC Dynamo Moscow players
HC Neftekhimik Nizhnekamsk players
Russian ice hockey goaltenders
Salavat Yulaev Ufa players
HC Yugra players
Sportspeople from Nizhny Novgorod